Darwinella is a genus of sponges belonging to the family Darwinellidae.

The species of this genus are found mostly in Southern Hemisphere.

Species:

Darwinella australiensis 
Darwinella corneostellata 
Darwinella dalmatica 
Darwinella duplex 
Darwinella gardineri 
Darwinella intermedia 
Darwinella muelleri 
Darwinella notabilis
Darwinella oxeata 
Darwinella pronzatoi 
Darwinella rosacea 
Darwinella simplex 
Darwinella tango 
Darwinella viscosa 
Darwinella warreni

References

Darwinellidae